Haloo Helsinki! (Hello, Helsinki!) is the debut studio album by Finnish pop rock band Haloo Helsinki!. It debuted at number six on the Finnish Albums Chart and charted for seven weeks.

Track listing

Charts

References

2008 debut albums
Haloo Helsinki! albums
EMI Records albums
Finnish-language albums